Chellamae is a 2004 Indian Tamil-language romantic thriller film directed by Gandhi Krishna, who directed the critically acclaimed Nila Kaalam. The film stars Vishal and Reema Sen in the lead role, while Bharath plays an antagonistic role. Vivek and Girish Karnad play supporting roles. The film's score and soundtrack are composed by Harris Jayaraj. This film marks the debut of Vishal as an actor.

Plot 
Mythili (Reema) showers love and affection on her neighbour Vishwa (Bharath) since childhood. Vishwa happens to be the only son of a rich business tycoon named Rajasekhar (Girish Karnad), who loses his mother at a young age. Mythili treats Vishwa as her younger brother and spends all her time with him. Ragunandan (Vishal), an Income Tax Inspector, turns up at Rajasekhar's house for an IT raid and happens to meet Mythili there. They eventually fall in love, and after a series of incidents, they get wed locked and later settle in Goa. The trouble begins when Vishwa reaches Goa in search of Mythili. He manages to kidnap her and bring her to Chennai. The reasons for Vishwa's obsession and possessiveness towards Mythili unfolds as the movie progresses. Ragunandan, who comes back to Goa, finds the house deserted. The next-door neighbour tells him that Mythili eloped with Vishwa. He then begins to track her down and finds that the duo had left to Chennai. Ragunandan reaches Chennai. With the help of his colleague Income Tax Inspector Harichandra (Vivek), he tries to trace Mythili out. A chance look at the video of their marriage throws light on Vishwa's hatred towards Ragunandan. Ragunandan is convinced that Mythili did not go on her own will. He confronts Rajasekhar, but he is of no help. Finally, he traces out the location of Vishwa's hideout. Mythili pleads with Vishwa to release her. She explains that she cannot be his wife and can see him as a son or little brother. The plea falls on deaf ears. In a racy climax on high seas, the three protagonists fight it out, and Mythili hits Vishwa with the boat oars. He plunges into the sea in an unconscious condition, taking Mythili along. Ragunandan soon saves her. Even though Mythili had killed Vishwa because of her attack on him, she is filled with remorse.

Cast 
 Reema as Mythili Ragunandan (Voice Dubbed By Renuka Kathir).
 Vishal as Ragunandan
 Reshmi Menon as Young Mythili.
 Bharath as Vishwa.
 Vivek as Harichandra, Raghu's friend.
 Girish Karnad as Rajasekhar, Vishwas's father.
 Sriranjini as Vaishnavi, Ragunandan's sister.
 Mumtaj as herself (guest appearance).
 Bhanupriya in a special appearance in song "Kummi Adi".

Production 
Newcomer Vishal was signed to work on the film, after Arjun, who worked with Vishal in Vedham, encouraged Vishal to accept the role. Bharath was cast in the role of "obsessed teenage lover" for the first time. Majority of the shoot was held in Goa while it was also shot at places like Chennai, Maldives, Mumbai and Bangkok and was completed in 50 days.

Soundtrack 
The music was composed by Harris Jayaraj.

Release and reception 
Indiaglitz wrote "All credits go to director Ar Gandhi Krishna for coming out with the movie Chellamae which is not only racy but also entertaining. Even without any big names in the cast, Gandhi Krishna has succeeded in weaving a magic on screen". Sify wrote "The story and screenplay of Gandhi Krishna is somewhat in the manner of Yash Chopra?s Darr and so many other obsessive love stories. Still he has come out with a racy film that is sure to satisfy the youth audience and has been packaged strictly to suit their tastes". Malathi Rangarajan of The Hindu wrote, "Traces of "Guna" and "Kadhal Kondain" are evident in "Chellamae," but Gandhi Krishna's refreshing approach to the storyline gives the necessary spark to make the venture watch-worthy till the end". Malini Mannath of Chennai Online wrote "Gandhi Krishna's apprenticeship under Shanker seems to have been a fruitful one, he having picked up the right ingredients, and extracting excellent team work from his cast and crew, to make Chellamay, an engaging entertainer". Visual Dasan of Kalki wrote that by taking the outline of the epic Ramayana, the director had given it an interesting plot set in a contemporary setting, strong incidents, seamless character creation, and a flawless script.

Chellame ran for 100 days. It was made with a budget of 3.5 crore and collected a share of 6 crore selling 3 million tickets worldwide. The film was dubbed and released in Telugu under the title, Prema Chadhurangam.

References

External links 
 

2000s romantic thriller films
2000s Tamil-language films
2004 films
Films scored by Harris Jayaraj
Films shot in Goa
Indian romantic thriller films